Elia Dalla Costa (14 May 1872 – 22 December 1961) was an Italian Roman Catholic prelate and cardinal who served as the Archbishop of Florence from 1931 until his death. Dalla Costa served as the Bishop of Padua from 1923 until 1931 when he was transferred to Florence; he was elevated to the cardinalate on 13 March 1933. Dalla Costa was a staunch anti-fascist and anti-communist and was known best for providing refuge for Jewish people during World War II and providing others with fake documentation to flee from persecution.

Dalla Costa was noted for his deep faith and holiness and became a revered figure in Florence. He was considered "papabile" in the conclave in 1939 since he was considered a pastoral and non-political prelate with a strong sense of faith. In 2012 the organization Yad Vashem named him as a "Righteous Among the Nations" due to saving the lives of Jews during the Holocaust at great risk to himself.

The cause for his beatification opened two decades after his death in 1981 and he was titled as a servant of God; he was named as venerable after Pope Francis confirmed his heroic virtue.

Life

Education and priesthood
Elia Dalla Costa was born in 1872 in Villaverla as the last of five children to Luigi Dalla Costa and Teresa Dal Balcon; the couple's first three children had all died as infants. Dalla Costa received his baptism as "Elia Angelo" on 23 June from Father Angelo Rossi and his godparents were Francesco Muraro di Bressanvido and Eugenia Dalla Costa. His mother died in 1877 when Dalla Costa was five which left him in the care of his father.

Dalla Costa completed his high school education in 1886 and set out to commence his ecclesial studies after this. He attended the seminaries in Vicenza and Padua (graduating in literature from the college in Padua) before being ordained to the priesthood in 1895. He underwent further studies in 1895 and finished that later in 1897 before doing pastoral work in Vicenza where he also taught. He served a brief stint as the parish priest at Villaverla as he substituted for an old and ailing pastor. He later served as the curate for Pievebelvicino and from 1902 until 1910 was the parish priest for Pozzoleone. On 10 November 1910 he was made the parish priest for Schio and remained there until 1922.

Dalla Costa rendered humanitarian services to the wounded and assumed care for orphaned children throughout World War I and was later decorated with the Croce di Cavaliere della Corona d'Italia for his actions. It was while serving as a bishop in Padua that he would restore 50 parishes that were damaged during the war.

Episcopate
In mid-1923 he was appointed as the Bishop of Padua and he received his episcopal consecration on the following 12 August from Bishop Ferdinando Rodolfi in the Vicenza Cathedral with Bishops Andrea Longhin and Apollonio Maggio serving as the co-consecrators. He was enthroned in his new diocese on the following 7 October at an installation Mass. Dalla Costa was later named as the Archbishop of Florence on 19 December 1931 and for five months in 1932 served as the apostolic administrator for his old Padua diocese. He was enthroned in his new archdiocese in 1932.

Cardinalate

Pope Pius XI created Dalla Costa as the Cardinal-Priest of San Marco on 13 March 1933. He received the red hat and his titular church on 16 March. Dalla Costa was a staunch anti-communist and anti-fascist; when Adolf Hitler visited Florence in 1938 he took the dramatic decision (despite great external pressure) to close all the doors and windows of the episcopal palace and refused to participate in the celebrations. He railed against the Italian Racial Laws deeming them an affront to human rights and dignities. He was one of the cardinal electors in the 1939 papal conclave (at which he received some votes as he was also a "papabile" candidate) that selected Pope Pius XII. He was considered to be papabile due to his pastoral sensitivities and due to the fact that he was considered a non-political prelate. Cardinal Francesco Marchetti Selvaggiani - who had voted for Pacelli (later Pius XII) - said Dalla Costa would have been elected as pope if the cardinals had wanted "an angel" rather than a diplomat. There were some sources suggesting that Pacelli himself had voted for either Dalla Costa or Federico Tedeschini. But others suggested that his candidature did not gain traction since he was deemed too anti-fascist (which could have been problematic) and was deemed to be cold and aloof.

During World War II and the Holocaust he became known for helping to save thousands of Italians from execution under the Fascist regime. He encouraged his priests to save Jewish people from persecution knowing all too well the fate that would befall them if arrested and deported. Dalla Costa organized an elaborate rescue network and also wrote to the heads of all the Florentine convents and monasteries asking them to shelter Jews to keep them safe. The cardinal also established a shelter for Jews within the Seminar Minore di Montughi and even sheltered some in the episcopal palace with him. Dalla Costa provided Jews with fake documents for them to flee and received these fake documents from one of the Franciscan monasteries in Assisi. But it soon became too dangerous to accept them from Assisi himself so decided that the Tour de France winner and famed athlete Gino Bartali (he presided over Bartali's 1940 wedding) could do so. Dalla Costa's rationale was that no soldier would dare stop Bartali from training when he was in fact delivering the fake documents. He had given safe haven to over 100 Italian Jews and 220 others from other countries.

Dalla Costa was close friends with Giorgio La Pira and the two often dined together and had discussions about the issues of the times. It was Dalla Costa who encouraged La Pira to run in Florentine local elections in 1951. The cardinal held two Catechetical Conferences in the archdiocese in 1933 and in 1940 and held two Diocesan Eucharistic Conferences in 1937 and later in 1946. He made four pastoral visits while serving as the archbishop. In 1951 he offered his resignation to Pope Pius XII though the pope refused it. But a compromise was later reached in 1954: Ermenegildo Florit was made the coadjutor so that he could aid Dalla Costa in his episcopal duties as the aged prelate grew ill.

He later participated in the 1958 conclave that resulted in the election of Pope John XXIII. Dalla Costa was close friends with Roncalli and met with him twice prior to the conclave to discuss it. It was alleged that Roncalli had either voted for Valerio Valeri or his friend Dalla Costa. Dalla Costa believed that Roncalli would make a good pope and confided as much to his old friend. But Roncalli objected that he was too old to serve at 76 though the aged cardinal was said to have replied: "That's ten years younger than me". He attended the coronation for the new pope on 4 November 1958 and returned to Florence that month where he said to people: "We have chosen a pope that you will like". It had been said that Dalla Costa voted for Roncalli in the conclave.

Dalla Costa ordained the two future cardinals Domenico Bartolucci (1939) and Silvano Piovanelli (1947) as priests.

Death
Dalla Costa died from lung complications in Florence during the morning on 22 December 1961 and is buried in the Duomo di Firenze. He was the oldest member of the College of Cardinals at his death.

Beatification process

The cause for Dalla Costa's canonization opened on 26 January 1981 under Pope John Paul II after the Congregation for the Causes of Saints issued the edict of "nihil obstat" (nothing against the cause) and titled him as a Servant of God. On 22 December 1981 the diocesan phase for the cause opened and closed sometime later. This investigation was held in the Florence archdiocese and the C.C.S. later validated this investigation on 19 November 1993 before receiving the Positio dossier from the postulation in 2007. This dossier was an extensive collation of documents and testimonies collected throughout the diocesan process.

The board of theologians assented to the continuation of the cause after investigating the dossier in their meeting held on 29 November 2016 while the cardinal and bishop members of the C.C.S. also approved it later on 2 May 2017. Dalla Costa was named as Venerable on 4 May 2017 after Pope Francis confirmed that the late cardinal had lived a model Christian life of heroic virtue.

Recognition
In November 2012 it was announced that Dalla Costa had been named on the previous 29 February as a "Righteous Among the Nations" after Yad Vashem in Jerusalem determined that he had done the most - at risk to himself - to save Jews from the horror of the Nazi Holocaust (or the Shoah) during the period before and during the war.

References

Bibliography

Casini, Tito (1972). Elia Dalla Costa : vita e magistero. Firenze: Libreria editrice fiorentina.  
Pallanti, Giovanni (2012). Elia Dalla Costa. Il Cardinale della carità e del coraggio. Cinisello Balsamo: Edizioni San Paolo.  
Villani, Giulio (1974). Il vescovo Elia Dalla Costa. Per una storia da fare. Firenze: Vallecchi.

External links
 Venerabile Elia Dalla Costa  
 The Cardinals of the Holy Roman Church 
 Hagiography Circle
 Catholic Hierarchy
 Yad Vashem

1872 births
1961 deaths
20th-century Italian Roman Catholic archbishops
20th-century venerated Christians
Bishops appointed by Pope Pius XI
Bishops of Padua
Cardinals created by Pope Pius XI
Catholic Righteous Among the Nations
20th-century Italian cardinals
Italian Righteous Among the Nations
People from the Province of Vicenza
Roman Catholic archbishops of Florence
University of Padua alumni
Venerated Catholics by Pope Francis